Abraham Brownrigg (born Ballypierce 3 December 1836 – died Kilkenny 1 October 1928) was an Irish Roman Catholic prelate, who served as the Bishop of Ossory from 1884 until his death.

Brownrigg was educated at CBS North Richmond Street (O'Connell's), Dublin, after his father moved his family to Dublin following the death of his father he was adopted by relatives and studied at St Peter's College, Wexford and St Patrick's College, Maynooth. He was ordained priest on 21 April 1861. He was principal of St Aidan's Academy, Enniscorthy, Co. Wexford, and then at St Peter's in the same county. He was consecrated a bishop on 14 December 1884.

References

1836 births
1928 deaths
Roman Catholic bishops of Ossory
People from County Carlow
People educated at O'Connell School
People educated at St Peter's College, Wexford

Alumni of St Patrick's College, Maynooth